Soslan Bostanov (born 17 July 1983) is a Russian judoka.

He is the gold medallist of the 2018 Judo Grand Prix Tashkent in the +100 kg category.

References

External links
 

1983 births
Living people
Russian male judoka